Nodal precession is the precession of the orbital plane of a satellite around the rotational axis of an astronomical body such as Earth. This precession is due to the non-spherical nature of a rotating body, which creates a non-uniform gravitational field. The following discussion relates to low Earth orbit of artificial satellites, which have no measurable effect on the motion of Earth. The nodal precession of more massive, natural satellites like the Moon is more complex.

Around a spherical body, an orbital plane would remain fixed in space around the gravitational primary body. However, most bodies rotate, which causes an equatorial bulge. This bulge creates a gravitational effect that causes orbits to precess around the rotational axis of the primary body.

The direction of precession is opposite the direction of revolution. For a typical prograde orbit around Earth (that is, in the direction of primary body's rotation), the longitude of the ascending node decreases, that is the node precesses westward. If the orbit is retrograde, this increases the longitude of the ascending node, that is the node precesses eastward. This nodal progression enables heliosynchronous orbits to maintain a nearly constant angle relative to the Sun.

Description

A non-rotating body of planetary scale or larger would be pulled by gravity into a spherical shape. Virtually all bodies rotate, however. The centrifugal force deforms the body so that it has an equatorial bulge. Because of the bulge of the central body, the gravitational force on a satellite is not directed toward the center of the central body, but is offset toward its equator. Whichever hemisphere of the central body the satellite lies over, it is preferentially pulled slightly toward the equator of the central body. This creates a torque on the satellite. This torque does not reduce the inclination; rather, it causes a torque-induced gyroscopic precession, which causes the orbital nodes to drift with time.

Equation

Rate of precession 
The rate of precession depends on the inclination of the orbital plane to the equatorial plane, as well as the orbital eccentricity.

For a satellite in a prograde orbit around Earth, the precession is westward (nodal regression), that is, the node and satellite move in opposite directions. A good approximation of the precession rate is

 

where
 is the precession rate (in rad/s),
 is the body's equatorial radius ( for Earth),
 is the semi-major axis of the satellite's orbit,
 is the eccentricity of the satellite's orbit,
 is the angular velocity of the satellite's motion (2 radians divided by its period in seconds),
 is its inclination,
 is the body's "second dynamic form factor" ( =  for Earth).

This last quantity is related to the oblateness as follows:

 

where 
 is the central body's oblateness,
 is central body's equatorial radius ( for Earth),
 is the central body's rotation rate ( for Earth),
 is the product of the universal constant of gravitation and the central body's mass ( for Earth).

The nodal progression of low Earth orbits is typically a few degrees per day to the west (negative). For a satellite in a circular ( = 0) 800 km altitude orbit at 56° inclination about Earth:

 

The precession is therefore

This is equivalent to −3.683° per day, so the orbit plane will make one complete turn (in inertial space) in 98 days.

The apparent motion of the sun is approximately +1° per day (360° per year / 365.2422 days per tropical year ≈ 0.9856473° per day), so apparent motion of the sun relative to the orbit plane is about 2.8° per day, resulting in a complete cycle in about 127 days. For retrograde orbits  is negative, so the precession becomes positive. (Alternatively,  can be thought of as positive but the inclination is greater than 90°, so the cosine of the inclination is negative.) In this case it is possible to make the precession approximately match the apparent motion of the sun, resulting in a heliosynchronous orbit.

The  used in this equation is the dimensionless coefficient  from the geopotential model or gravity field model for the body.

See also
 Axial precession, or "precession of the equinoxes" for Earth
 Apsidal precession, another kind of orbital precession (the change in the argument of periapsis)
 Lunar standstill, in which the Moon's declination on the lunistices depends on the precession of its orbital nodes
 Lunar node

References

External links
Nodal regression description from USENET
Discussion of nodal regression from Analytical Graphics

Astrodynamics
Precession